Azlan Shah Stadium is a field hockey stadium at Ipoh, Perak, Malaysia. It is the permanent venue of the Sultan Azlan Shah Cup.

Events
 2001 Sultan Azlan Shah Cup

References

External links
 Azlan Shah Cup Website

Field hockey venues in Malaysia
Buildings and structures in Ipoh
Sports venues in Perak
1984 establishments in Malaysia